Experimental Biology and Medicine was a peer-reviewed academic journal of biology and medicine published by Karger Publishers from 1967 to 1987. The publication resumed as Issues in Biomedicine from 1990 to 1991, until its cessation. The journal was indexed in Index Medicus.

References

Karger academic journals
Publications established in 1967
Publications disestablished in 1991
Irregular journals
English-language journals